Noctua may refer to:

Noctua (company), a computer hardware company
Noctua (constellation), an archaic constellation
Noctua (moth), a genus of moths